Qaleh-ye Hajj Amin (also Romanized as Qal‘eh-ye Ḩājj Amīn; also known as Qal‘eh-ye Ḩājjī Amīn) is a village in Satar Rural District, Kolyai District, Sonqor County, Kermanshah Province, Iran. At the 2006 census, its population was 456, in 119 families.

References 

Populated places in Sonqor County